The Pitt Professorship of American History and Institutions was established at the University of Cambridge on 5 February 1944 from a sum of £44,000 received from the Syndics of the Cambridge University Press in 1943 and augmented by a further £5,000 in 1946. The title of the chair was changed to the Pitt Professorship of American History and Institutions in 1951.

The professorship is unusual in that tenure is for a period of one year only.

List of Pitt Professors of American History and Institutions

1945–46            Dexter Perkins 
1946–47            No election
1947–48            Henry Steele Commager
1948–49            Roy Franklin Nichols
1949–50            Walt Whitman Rostow 
1950–51            John Donald Hicks 
1951–53            Ralph Henry Gabriel
1952–53            Avery Odelle Craven  
1953–54            Corwin D. Edwards  
1954–55            John Bartlet Brebner 
1955–56            William Thomas Easterbrook
1956–57            Edward Chase Kirkland 
1957–58            Paul Abraham Freund 
1958–59            Richard Hofstadter 
1959–60            Eugene Victor Rostow 
1960–61            Clinton Lawrence Rossiter 
1961–62            Richard Palmer Blackmur 
1962–63            John Hope Franklin 
1963–64            John Morton Blum 
1964–65            Daniel Joseph Boorstin 
1965–66            Thomas Childs Cochran 
1966–67            Peter Michael Blau 
1967–68            James Willard Hurst 
1968–69            William Clement Eaton 
1969–70            Henry David  
1970–71            Walter Galenson  
1971–72            Henry Farnham May 
1972–73            Morris Janowitz 
1973–74            Eric Louis McKitrick 
1974–75            Archibald Cox  
1975–76            Robert William Fogel 
1976–77            Eugene Dominic Genovese 
1977–78            Paul Allan David
1978–79            Stephan Thernstrom
1979–80            Eliot Freidson 
1980–81            Eric Foner  
1981–82            Douglass Cecil North 
1982–83            Gordon Stewart Wood
1983–84            Judith N. Shklar  
1984–85            Robert Huddleston Wiebe 
1985–86            Peter Temin  
1986–87            Bernard Bailyn 
1987–88            Daniel Bell  
1988–89            Warren Forbes Kimball 
1989–90            Nathan Rosenberg
1990–91            Timothy Hall Breen 
1991–92            Vacant
1992–93            Carol Gilligan     
1993–94            Michael Fitzgibbon Holt
1994–95            Peter Gavin Wright 
1995–96            Dan Thomas Carter
1996–97            John Shelton Reed
1997–98            Sylvia R. Frey   
1998–99            Stanley Engerman
1999–2000        James Tyler Petterson
2000–01            Randall Collins
2001–02            James L. Roark
2002–03            Timothy W Guinnane
2003–04            Daniel T. Rodgers
2004–05            Michael Mann
2005–06            Mary Beth Norton
2006–07            Michael D. Bordo
2007–08            J Mills Thornton
2008–09            James T. Kloppenberg
2009–10            Nancy A. Hewitt
2010–11            Gary Libecap
2011–12            Alan Brinkley
2012–13            Jeffrey C. Alexander
2013–14            David Blight
2014–15            Barry Eichengreen
2015–16            Margaret Jacobs
2016–17            Loïc Wacquant
2017–18            Ira Katznelson
2018–19            Naomi Lamoreaux

References 

American History and Institutions, Pitt
American History and Institutions, Pitt
1944 establishments in England